This is a list of flag bearers who have represented Russia at the Olympics.

Flag bearers carry the national flag of their country at the opening ceremony of the Olympic Games.

See also
Russia at the Olympics

References

Russia at the Olympics
Russia
Olympic flagbearers